The 6th season of Liga ABA saw them change their name to the ABA NLB League as their general sponsor changed.  Goodyear Tire and Rubber Company ceded their sponsorship rights to the NLB group.

In other changes, after Montenegro declared independence in 2006, Budućnost returned to the regional league with a wild-card given by the NLB League board. And the Final Four tournament was replaced with a playoff.

14 teams from Bosnia and Herzegovina, Croatia, Montenegro, Serbia and Slovenia participated in the NLB League in its sixth season: Union Olimpija, Helios, Geoplin Slovan, Cibona, Zadar, Zagreb, Split, Široki ERONET, Bosna ASA BH TELECOM, Crvena zvezda, Partizan, Hemofarm, FMP Železnik, Budućnost.

There were 26 rounds played in the regular part of the season. The best four teams qualified for the play-off (best-of-three series).

Partizan became the 2007 NLB League Champion.

Regular season

Stats Leaders

Points

Rebounds

Assists

Ranking MVP

Playoffs

2006–07
2006–07 in European basketball leagues
2006–07 in Serbian basketball
2006–07 in Slovenian basketball
2006–07 in Croatian basketball
2006–07 in Bosnia and Herzegovina basketball